Ladins Dolomites is a minor political party representing the Ladin-speaking minority in South Tyrol.

History
The party, whose original name was Ladins Political Movement (MPL), was founded in the early 1990s by Carlo Willeit, who led it in the 1993 provincial election (2.0% of the vote and 1 seat, for Willeit himself) and in 1998 provincial election (3.6%, along with the Democratic Party of South Tyrol, and 1 seat). After that, the party failed to have any elects both in the 2003 and 2008 elections (1.4% and 1.1%, respectively). In 2008, the party took its current name.

In the 2013 provincial election LD ran within a three-party list, along with the Citizens' Union for South Tyrol and We South Tyroleans. The coalition won 2.1% of the vote and Andreas Pöder, leader of the Citizens' Union, was its sole elect to the Provincial Council. In Ladin areas the coalition did worse than LD alone in 2008.

References

External links
Official website

Ladin language
Political parties in South Tyrol
Political parties of minorities